Spells is the fourth studio album by the indie rock band The Comas. It was released in 2007 on Vagrant Records.

Track listing
All songs written by Andrew Herod. 
"Red Microphones"
"Hannah T"
"Now I'm a Spider" 
"Come My Sunshine"
"Stoneded"
"Light the Pad" (Herod, Adam Price)
"Sarah T"
"Thistledown"
"New Wolf"
"After the Afterglow"

References

External links
TheComas.com (Official site)
Vagrant Records

2007 albums
The Comas albums
Vagrant Records albums